Sur Chah or Soorchah may refer to:
 Sur Chah-e Bala
 Sur Chah-e Pain